Saphenista rufozodion is a species of moth of the family Tortricidae. It is found in Carchi Province, Ecuador.

The wingspan is about 11 mm. The ground colour of the forewings is creamy ochreous, partially suffused with brownish ochreous and with some golden lines or elongate spots at the edges of the markings. The hindwings are whitish and glossy.

References

Moths described in 2002
Saphenista